Raúl Nogués (born 26 February 1952) is an Argentine former football midfielder who has played for clubs in Argentina and France.

Honours

Club
 Lille
Ligue 2: 1973–74

 Marseille
Coupe de France: 1975–76

 Monaco
Ligue 1: 1977–78
Coupe de France: 1979–80

Individual
 La Chaux-de-Fonds
Swiss Foreign Footballer of the Year: 1983–84

References

External links
Raúl Nogués at BDFA.com.ar 
Profile at om1899 

1952 births
Living people
Sportspeople from Buenos Aires Province
Argentine footballers
Argentine expatriate footballers
Association football midfielders
Chacarita Juniors footballers
Lille OSC players
Olympique de Marseille players
AS Monaco FC players
OGC Nice players
AS Saint-Étienne players
Racing Club de France Football players
FC La Chaux-de-Fonds players
Étoile Carouge FC players
Expatriate footballers in France
Expatriate footballers in Monaco
Expatriate footballers in Switzerland
Argentine expatriate sportspeople in France
Argentine expatriate sportspeople in Monaco
Ligue 1 players
Ligue 2 players
Pan American Games medalists in football
Pan American Games gold medalists for Argentina
Footballers at the 1971 Pan American Games
Medalists at the 1971 Pan American Games